Fairfield railway station serves the Fairfield area of Droylsden, Tameside, Greater Manchester and is located   east of Manchester Piccadilly station. It was opened by the Manchester, Sheffield & Lincolnshire Railway in 1892, when the Fallowfield Loop to Manchester Central opened; it replaced an earlier station that had opened on the line in 1841, west of the present site. For a suburban station, Fairfield has very low passenger usage.

History
Fairfield station, originally known as Fairfield for Droylsden, was a junction with a pair of lines from the east breaking off and running to the south; this thereby facilitated a route, called the Fallowfield Loop, to Longsight, south Manchester and Manchester Central station. By means of a switchback to Gorton and Openshaw, this branch enabled the turning round of locomotives without need for a turntable in the area. This could have been invaluable for servicing both the Guide Bridge yards and the facilities of Gorton and Beyer, Peacock & Company locomotive factories. The Fallowfield Loop line was closed to passenger services in July 1958 and to all traffic in 1988.

The station currently has two platforms but, for many years, it had six, with two island platforms and two side platforms. Two were used for local services; two for Woodhead Line express services between Manchester Piccadilly and Sheffield Victoria; and two for services and movements to Reddish Electric Depot via the Fallowfield Loop.

The station name was changed from Fairfield for Droylsden to Fairfield on 6 May 1974.

Facilities
The amenities offered at the unstaffed station are very basic, with no ticket provision or permanent buildings other than basic waiting shelters. Train running information is provided by telephone and timetable posters. No step-free access is provided, with only staircases in place to the main entrance from both platforms.

Services
At Fairfield, there is an hourly service to Manchester Piccadilly and towards Rose Hill Marple via Guide Bridge; the evening service is limited and there is no Sunday service.

References

External links

Droylsden
Former Great Central Railway stations
DfT Category F2 stations
Railway stations in Great Britain opened in 1841
Railway stations in Tameside
Northern franchise railway stations